"Anywhere for You" is the debut solo single by Swedish singer-songwriter John Martin, as the lead single from his debut studio album. The song was released in Sweden as a digital download on 12 February 2014 and was released in the United Kingdom on 30 March 2014. The song was written by John Martin, Vincent Pontare, Michel Zitron and Adam Baptiste, the song was produced by Michel Zitron. The song has peaked to number 38 on the Swedish Singles Chart, the song has also peaked to number 47 in Australia.

Background
John Martin co-wrote and produced with Michel Zitron. Talking to Digital Spy about the song he said, "Michel and I wrote it on a writing trip to LA where we rented a house and spent time reflecting on how blessed we have been for doing what we love and with the incredible experiences we have had since things really took off musically for us, it's all about what is important - friends, family and lovers back home. It's what really counts in life. It's the first track off the album to be released as it's really what I'm about. It means a lot to me personally." Talking to STV's Laura Boyd about the song he said, "I’m really proud of that song. Now people really recognise my voice and the style. I already have a big fanbase before the first single comes out, so that makes it a lot easier."

Live performances
On 27 March 2014 he performed an acoustic version of the song on Scottish independent local radio station serving Glasgow and West Central Scotland Clyde 1.

Music video
A music video to accompany the release of "Anywhere for You" was first released onto YouTube on 12 February 2014 at a total length of three minutes and forty-one seconds. The start of the video shows a young couple driving a pickup truck through the countryside and John Martin performing the song. It then shows the couple walking through the countryside and finding a house. As of July 2016, the video has had more than 9 million views.

A second video for the Tiësto vs. Dzeko & Torres remix of the song was first released onto YouTube on 19 March 2014 at a total length of three minutes and thirty-five seconds. The video shows scenes from John Martin's original video along with added footage of the DJs in action and lyrics. This video has received over 6 million views as of July 2016.

Track listing

Charts

Weekly charts

Year-end charts

Release history

References

2014 debut singles
2014 songs
Island Records singles
John Martin (singer) songs
Songs written by Adam Baptiste
Songs written by Dr. Luke
Songs written by Michel Zitron
Songs written by Vincent Pontare
Songs written by John Martin (singer)